Hal Young (1890–1970) was a British cinematographer. After gaining experience in Hollywood he returned to his native Britain where he was employed by Gainsborough Pictures.

Selected filmography
 The Common Law (1916)
 The Foolish Virgin (1916)
 The Price She Paid (1917)
 Scandal (1917)
 Private Peat (1918)
 The Studio Girl (1918)
 My Cousin (1918)
 Here Comes the Bride (1919)
 Anne of Green Gables (1919)
 The Witness for the Defense (1919)
 Civilian Clothes (1920)
 The Great Day (1920)
 Appearances (1921)
 The Mystery Road (1921)
 The Call of Youth (1921)
 Burn 'Em Up Barnes (1921)
 Fox Farm (1922)
 The Rat (1925)
 The Prude's Fall (1925)
 The Triumph of the Rat (1926)
 The Lodger (1927)
 Suspense (1930)
 Tons of Money (1930)
 Many Waters (1931)
 Love on the Spot (1932)
 Broken Blossoms (1936)

References

Bibliography
 MacNab, Geoffrey. Searching for stars: stardom and screen acting in British cinema. Casell, 2000.

External links

1890 births
1970 deaths
British cinematographers
British expatriates in the United States